The tenth government of Israel was formed on 2 November 1961 following the August elections. Although David Ben-Gurion was appointed Prime Minister, the government was actually formed by Minister of Finance Levi Eshkol. On 7 September Ben-Gurion had told President Yitzhak Ben-Zvi that he was unable to form a government; on 14 September Ben-Zvi asked Eshkol to form a government, with Eshkol subsequently announcing that he would do so with Ben-Gurion as PM. It turned out to be the last government led by Ben-Gurion.

The coalition included Mapai, the National Religious Party, Ahdut HaAvoda, Poalei Agudat Yisrael, Cooperation and Brotherhood and Progress and Development. Deputy Ministers were appointed four days after the cabinet was in place.

The government fell on 16 June 1963 when Ben-Gurion resigned "because of personal needs". However, in reality he was annoyed at a perceived lack of support from his colleagues.

Cabinet members

1 Died in office.

2 Although Yosef was not an MK at the time, he was a member of Mapai.

3 Although Sasson was not an MK at the time, he was elected to the next Knesset as a member of the Alignment, an alliance of Mapai and Ahdut HaAvoda.

References

External links
Fifth Knesset: Government 10 Knesset website

 10
1961 establishments in Israel
1963 disestablishments in Israel
Cabinets established in 1961
Cabinets disestablished in 1963
1961 in Israeli politics
1962 in Israeli politics
1963 in Israeli politics
 10